This list is a part of the international List of Gothic brick buildings.
For the parts of this list on the various countries see:

– In long tables, vertical arrows link to the navigation boards above (after the preceding table) and below (before the next table). –

Western Pomerania
– and other former territories of the House of the Griffins –

Gdańsk Pomerania
– Pomeranian Voivodeship west of Wistula river and a section of Kujawian-Pomeranian Voivodeship around Świecie;ruled by the Teutonic Order from 1309/1317 to 1466 –

Land of Chełmno
– Territory of the Teutonic Order from 1225 to 1466 –

Warmia, Masuria & Pomesania 
– Territory of the Old Prussians, conquered by the Teutonic Order in the 13th and 14th centuries, Warmia since 1466 part of (Polish) Royal Prussia –

Greater Poland, Kujawy & Łęczyca

Mazowia & Land of Dobrzyn

Lubusz Voivodeship
– Similar extent as the Neumark of Brandenburg (1249–1945) –

Eastern Poland
– Former Podlachian and Polesian (Brest Litovskian) Voivodeships –

Silesia

– Silesian, Opole and Lower Silesian Voivodeships –

Lesser Poland
– Lesser Poland, Subcarpathian, Świętokrzyskian & Lublin Voivodeships –

Bibliography 
Sławomir Brzezicki & al. – Zabytki sztuki w Polsce – Śląsk (Krajowy Ośrodek Badań i Dokumentacij Zabytków, Warszawa)
Sławomir Brzezicki & al. – Dehi-Handbuch der Kunstdenkmäler in Polen – Schlesien (Deutscher Kunstverlag, Berlin)
Marianne Mehling (ed.): Knaurs Kulturführer in Farbe Polen. München 1995. 
 Michael Antoni (ed.): Georg Dehio Handbuch der deutschen Kunstdenkmäler. West- und Ostpreußen. München 1993. 
 Georg Dehio: Handbuch der deutschen Kunstdenkmäler. Band 2: Nordostdeutschland. Berlin, 1906 (digitized see digi.ub.uni-heidelberg.de), comprising about half of presentday Poland.

References 

Brick Gothic
Buildings and structures in Poland